Jack Hodgins (born October 3, 1938 in Comox Valley, British Columbia) is a Canadian novelist and short story writer.  
Critically acclaimed, among his best received works is Broken Ground (1998), a historical novel set after the First World War, for which he received the Ethel Wilson Fiction Prize and many other accolades.

Biography
Jack Hodgins grew up in Merville, a small town in the Comox Valley of British Columbia.  He left home for Vancouver, where he attended the University of British Columbia, and was encouraged by Earle Birney, graduating with a bachelor's degree in Education.  Hodgins spent the next 18 years of his career teaching English in Nanaimo, back on Vancouver Island.

In 1968, his first piece of literary work was accepted by a publication, and the exposure allowed him the chance to expand his work in print.  With the publication of his first book of short stories, "Spit Delaney's Island" (1976), and his first novel "The Invention of the World" (1977), Jack Hodgins was well on his way to becoming a recognized name in Canadian literature, before taking a position at the University of Victoria in the Creative Writing Department.

He began receiving short-term teaching positions at universities throughout Canada, including Simon Fraser University and the University of Ottawa. (http://www.nwpassages.com/bios/hodgins.asp). His passion to educate led him around the world- he lectured in countries such as Japan, Finland, Norway, Germany, Spain, and Australia. In 1983, he accepted a position as a professor of Creative Writing at the University of Victoria. He and his family settled themselves in Victoria and stayed through until the time of his retirement from teaching, in 2002.

Hodgins continues his life in Victoria today and occasionally gives lectures on writing and speaks at a workshop in Mallorca, Spain annually. Hodgins has received much recognition for his work including the Eaton's BC Book Award for "Spit Delaney's Island," the Lieutenant Governor's Award for Literary Excellence in 2006, and the Terasen Lifetime Achievement Award.  In 2001, a play based on several short stories from his book "The Barclay Family Theatre" was made into an opera by composer Christopher Donnison and premiered on stage in Victoria, BC.  His life has been commemorated in a National Film Board Film entitled Jack Hodgins' Island.

Literature and the Environment
Hodgins' close relationship with the environment stems from his personal experiences within the temperate rainforests and seasides of British Columbia. Places like Comox Valley, Nanaimo, and Victoria, as well as his travels abroad, have influenced his writing and the contents of his books. His characters in "Innocent Cities" are based on actual residents of the city of Victoria in the late 1900s, as well as people he met on his travels to Australia. "The Invention of the World" is based on the legendary cult leader Brother Twelve and his followers from outside Nanaimo, BC. "The Macken Charm", set in 1956, illustrates the Comox Valley with characters inspired by influential people in his life. He based the many settings in "Spit Delaney's Island" around places he has lived or previously travelled. 
	In an email interview with students from the University of Victoria, Hodgins elaborates on place affecting his writing, and uses "Macken Charm" as his example.

"In The Macken Charm the family gathers (after a family funeral) at the site of a burnt hotel owned by the family. This place exists still. My own memories go back to playing as a child in that hotel when it was no longer in use. I knew that my parents began their married life in that hotel—the old uncle who owned it asked them to move in and look after it and them. My mother learned to cook 
on a stove big enough for a hotel dining room full of guests! All of this is in the novel, pretty well just as it happens, though the characters are fictitious replacements for the originals. The beach, the trees, the roads, the cars of 1956, the store, the funeral parlour, the bridge over the river in Courtenay, the glacier—they're all there. The story is fiction but the place is real."

Awards and honours
2009 Member of the Order of Canada
2006 Lieutenant Governor's Award for Literary Excellence
2006 Terasen Lifetime Achievement Award "for an outstanding literary career in British Columbia"
2004 Honorary D.Litt, University of Victoria
2004 Distance: shortlisted for the inaugural City of Victoria Book Award
2004 Distance: longlisted for the IMPAC/Dublin Award
2000 Broken Ground: the Torgi Talking Book of the Year
2000 Broken Ground: longlisted for the IMPAC/Dublin Award
2000 Broken Ground: the Ethel Wilson Prize for fiction in British Columbia
1999 Broken Ground: The Drummer General Award (Different Drummer Bookstore)
1999 Broken Ground: jury choice as Best Novel of the Year in Quill and Quire
1999 Broken Ground: in Globe and Mail Top Ten
1999 Elected to the Royal Society of Canada
1998 Honorary D.Litt., Malaspina University-College
1996 "Finding Merville": (Comox Valley Record) first place in Neville Shanks Memorial Award for Historical Writing
1995 Honorary D.Litt., University of British Columbia
1988 The Honorary Patron: short listed for the Stephen Leacock Award for Humour
1988 The Honorary Patron: the Commonwealth Literature Prize (Canada-Caribbean region)
1986 The Canada-Australia Prize
1979 The Resurrection of Joseph Bourne: The Governor General's Literary Award for Fiction
1978 The Invention of the World: shortlisted for the Books in Canada First Novel Award
1978 The Invention of the World: Gibson's First Novel Award
1977 Spit Delaney's Island: short listed for the Governor General's Award
1977 Spit Delaney's Island: the Eaton's B.C. Book Award
1973 "After the Season": the President's Medal, University of Western Ontario

Bibliography

Novels
The Invention of the World – 1977
The Resurrection of Joseph Bourne – 1979 (winner of the Governor General's Award for English Language Fiction)
The Honorary Patron – 1987
Innocent Cities – 1990
The Macken Charm – 1995
Broken Ground – 1998 (winner of the 1999 Ethel Wilson Fiction Prize)
Distance – 2003
The Master of Happy Endings - 2010 (finalist for the Ethel Wilson Fiction Prize)

Short stories
Spit Delaney's Island –1976 (winner of the Eaton's BC Book Award)
"By The River" 
The Barclay Family Theatre – 1981
Damage Done by the Storm – 2005

Children's literature
Left Behind in Squabble Bay – 1989

Non-fiction
Over Forty in Broken Hill – 1992 
A Passion for Narrative: A Guide for Writing Fiction – 1994

Periodicals
Short stories and articles have been published in several magazines in Canada, France, Australia, and the US, including:

Northwest Review
Antigonish Review
Wascana Review
Descant (Texas)
Capilano Review
Prism International
Paris Intercontinental
Saturday Night
Vancouver
Westerly
Story
Toronto Life
North American Review
Event
Canadian Fiction Magazine
Sound Heritage
Alphabet
Viva
Journal of Canadian Fiction
The Canadian Forum
Forum (Houston)
Island No.2
Meanjin
The Literary Half-yearly
Overland

Anthologies

Teaching Short Fiction, edited with Bruce Nesbitt: (ComCept Publishing)

Voice and Vision, edited with W.H. New: (McClelland and Stewart)

The Frontier Experience: (Macmillan of Canada, 1975)

The West Coast Experience: (Macmillan of Canada, 1976)

BEGINNINGS: samplings from a long apprenticeship: novels which were imagined, written, re-written, rejected, abandoned, and supplanted:
(Grand Union Press, 1983)

References

External links
 Archives of Jack Hodgings [Jack Hodgings fonds, R11749) are held at Library and Archives Canada

1938 births
Living people
Canadian male novelists
Canadian male short story writers
Fellows of the Royal Society of Canada
Governor General's Award-winning fiction writers
Members of the Order of Canada
Academic staff of the University of Victoria
University of British Columbia alumni
20th-century Canadian short story writers
21st-century Canadian short story writers
20th-century Canadian novelists
21st-century Canadian novelists
20th-century Canadian male writers
21st-century Canadian male writers